Xiled to Infinity and One is an album released in 2002 by the American heavy metal band Seven Witches.

Track listing 
All tracks written by Wade Black and Jack Frost, except "The Burning" by Frost and Jon Oliva and "See You in Hell" by Nick Bowcott and Steve Grimmett.
 "Metal Tyrant" – 4:07
 "Incubus" – 5:21
 "Salvation" – 3:30
 "Xiled to Infinity and One" – 5:49
 "Warmth of Winter" – 4:17
 "Anger's Door" – 5:03
 "Eyes of an Angel" – 4:37
 "Pain" – 3:47
 "The Burning (Incubus Reprise)" – 5:22
 "See You in Hell" – 4:23 (Grim Reaper cover)

Personnel
Seven Witches
Wade Black – lead vocals
Jack Frost – guitars, backing vocals, producer, engineer, mixing 
Billy Mez – bass
Brian Craig – drums

Guest musicians
Jon Oliva – lead vocals on "The Burning"
Joe Comeau – duet vocals on "See You in Hell" and intro solo on "Salvation"

Production
Don Sternecker – co-producer, engineer
Joey Vera – co-producer, engineer, mixing
Tommy Hansen – mastering at Jailhouse Studios
Jean-Pascal Fournier – cover art

References

External links
 Seven Witches' official website

2002 albums
Noise Records albums
Seven Witches albums
Albums with cover art by Jean-Pascal Fournier